Sir Peter Courtney Quennell  (9 March 1905 – 27 October 1993) was an English biographer, literary historian, editor, essayist, poet, and critic. He wrote extensively on social history.

Life
Born in Bickley, Kent, the son of architect C. H. B. Quennell and Marjorie Quennell, he was educated at Berkhamsted Grammar School and at Balliol College, Oxford.  While still at school some of his poems were selected by Richard Hughes for the anthology Public School Verse, which brought him to the attention of writers such as Edith Sitwell.

In 1922 he published his first book, Masques and Poems. This was followed by many other volumes, particularly his Four Portraits of 1945 (studies of Boswell, Gibbon, Sterne, and Wilkes), books on London and works on Baudelaire (1929), Byron (1934–35), Pope (1949), Ruskin (1949), Hogarth (1955), Shakespeare (1963), Proust (1971) and Samuel Johnson (1972).

He first practised journalism in London. In 1930 he taught at the University of Tokyo. In 1944–51, he was editor of The Cornhill Magazine and from 1951 to 1979 founder-editor of History Today.

Quennell published two volumes of autobiography, The Marble Foot (1976) and Wanton Chase (1980).

He was appointed a Commander of the Order of the British Empire (CBE), and was knighted in the 1992 New Year Honours.

He married five times, and had two children, a daughter Sarah from his third marriage and Alexander from his fifth. He died in London.

Quennell's first cousin – daughter of his father's brother Walter – was Joan Quennell, a Conservative MP.

Works
Masques & Poems (1922)
Oxford Poetry (1924), editor with Harold Acton
Poems (1926)
Inscription on a Fountainhead (1929), poetry pamphlet
Baudelaire And The Symbolists: Five Essays (1929)
Memoirs of the Comte de Gramont (1930), with Anthony Hamilton
The Phoenix Kind (1931), novel
A Superficial Journey Through Tokyo and Peking (1932), travel memoir
A Letter to Mrs. Virginia Woolf (Hogarth Press 1932)
Aspects of Seventeenth Century Verse (1933), editor
Byron (1934)
Byron: the Years of Fame (1935)
Somerset (1936), Shell Guide with C. H. B. Quennell
The Private Letters of Princess Lieven to Prince Metternich 1820–1826 (1937), editor
Victorian Panorama: a survey of life & fashion from contemporary photographs (1937)
Sympathy (1938), stories
To Lord Byron: Feminine Profiles – based upon unpublished letters 1807–1824 (1939) with George Paston
Caroline of England: An Augustan Portrait (1940)
Brown the Bear: Who scared the villagers out of their wits (circa 1940), translator Katharine Busvine
Byron In Italy (1941)
Four Portraits: Studies of the Eighteenth Century – James Boswell, Edward Gibbon, Laurence Sterne, John Wilkes (1945)
Time Exposure (1946) with Cecil Beaton
John Ruskin: The Portrait of a Prophet (1949)
The Pleasures Of Pope (1949)
Mayhew's London (1949)
My Heart Laid Bare and Other Prose Writings by Charles Baudelaire (1950), editor, translator Norman Cameron
Byron: A Self-Portrait – Letters and Diaries 1798–1824 (2 Volumes) (1950), editor
London's Underworld by Henry Mayhew (1951), editor
Mayhew's Characters (1951)The Singular Preference (1952)Spring In Sicily (1952), travel bookSelected writings of John Ruskin (1952), editorDiversions of History (1954)Hogarth's Progress (1955)Selected Verse and Prose Works Including Letters and Extracts from Lord Byron's Journal and Diaries, 1959The Past We Share. An Illustrated History of the British and American Peoples (1960), with Alan HodgeThe Sign of the Fish (1960)Byronic Thoughts: Maxims Reflections Portraits From the Prose and Verse of Lord Byron (1961)Selected Essays of Henry de Montherlant (1961), editor, John Weightman translatorThe Prodigal Rake – memoirs of William Hickey (1962), editorEdward Lear in Southern Italy: Journals of a Landscape Painter in southern Calabria and the Kingdom of Naples (1964), introductionAlexander Pope: The education of genius 1688–1728 (1968)Henry de Montherlant, with translator Terence KilmartinThe Girls, A Tetralogy of Novels : The Girls, Pity for Women, The Hippograf & The LepersThe Colosseum – a History of Rome from the Time of Nero (1971)Shakespeare, a biography (1963)The Journal of Thomas Moore (1964) editorWho's Who in Shakespeare (1971)Casanova in London (1971), essaysMarcel Proust, 1871–1922: A Centennial Volume (1971)Samuel Johnson – his friends and enemies (1973)Romantic England Writing And Painting 1717–1851 (1970)A History of English Literature (1973)The Marble Foot: An Autobiography, 1905–1938 (1977)The Day Before Yesterday (1978)Vladimir Nabokov: a Tribute (1979) editorCustoms and characters: Contemporary portraits (1982)Wanton Chase: An Autobiography from 1939 (1980)Genius in the Drawing Room (UK)/Affairs of the Mind: the Salon in Europe and America (1980), editorA Lonely Business: A Self-Portrait of James Pope-Hennessy (1981) editorThe Selected Essays of Cyril Connolly (1984) editorThe Last Edwardians: An Illustrated History of Violet Trefusis and Alice Keppel (1985) with John Phillips and Lorna SageAn Illustrated Companion to World Literature (1986) editor, original Tore ZetterholmThe Pursuit of Happiness (1988)

See also
Duncan Fallowell, 20th Century Characters'', ch. Feline: the Quennells on Primrose Hill, (London, Vintage books, 1994)

Notes

External links
 
 

1905 births
1993 deaths
English autobiographers
English biographers
English editors
English historians
English literary critics
People educated at Berkhamsted School
People from Bickley
Commanders of the Order of the British Empire
Knights Bachelor
20th-century English poets
English male poets
20th-century English male writers
English male non-fiction writers
Academic staff of the University of Tokyo